Put to the Test (German: Auf Probe gestellt) is a 1918 German silent comedy film directed by Rudolf Biebrach and starring Henny Porten, Heinrich Schroth and Reinhold Schünzel.

The film's sets were designed by the art director Ludwig Kainer.

Cast
 Henny Porten as Gräfin Marlene von Steinitz 
 Heinrich Schroth as Graf von Steinitz, Marlenes Schwager 
 Reinhold Schünzel as Reichsgraf Adolar von Warowingen 
 Hermann Thimig as Frank Merwin, Maler 
 Rudolf Biebrach as Haushofmeister 
 Kurt Vespermann
 Kurt Ehrle

References

Bibliography
 Jung, Uli & Schatzberg, Walter. Beyond Caligari: The Films of Robert Wiene. Berghahn Books, 1999.

External links

1918 films
Films of the German Empire
German silent feature films
Films directed by Rudolf Biebrach
German comedy films
1918 comedy films
UFA GmbH films
German black-and-white films
Silent comedy films
1910s German films